Charles Wepner (born February 26, 1939) is an American former professional boxer. He fell just nineteen seconds short of a full fifteen rounds against world heavyweight champion Muhammad Ali in a 1975 championship fight. Wepner also scored notable wins over Randy Neumann and former world heavyweight champion Ernie Terrell. He was also the last man to fight former undisputed world heavyweight champion Sonny Liston.

Wepner's boxing career, and fight with Ali after, inspired the 1976 film Rocky, and other life events were chronicled in the 2016 film, Chuck. He was also the subject of the 2019 film The Brawler.

Early life 
Charles Wepner was born on February 26, 1939, in New York City. He is of German, Ukrainian, and Polish descent.

Wepner learned to fight on the streets of Bayonne, New Jersey, saying, "This was a tough town with a lot of people from the docks and the naval base and you had to fight to survive". Wepner was about a year old when he moved in with his grandmother on 28th Street near Hudson Boulevard (now Kennedy Boulevard). He was raised by his mother and grandparents, living in a room that was a converted coal shed until he was 13. He was an avid player of sports in his youth, playing basketball for the Police Athletic League. At Bayonne High School, his height helped him get a spot on the basketball team.

At the age of 15, Wepner opted to join the U.S. Marines, inspired by the movie Battle Cry. In the marines he became a member of the boxing team, developing a reputation for being able to withstand other boxers' punches, and becoming a military champion at one of the airbases. A 1975 Sports Illustrated article said that Wepner had saved the lives of three Marine pilots, pulling them from blazing airplanes.

Career 
Wepner turned professional in 1964 and became a popular boxer on the Northeast's Club Boxing circuit, where he began posting many wins and some losses fighting throughout the region, including in arenas close to his boyhood home such as North Bergen and Secaucus.

Nicknamed "The Bayonne Bleeder" due to repeated facial injuries in the ring, he took the name that was initially meant as an insult and made it his nom de guerre. In an interview with the BBC, Wepner said "I was a big bleeder. I had 328 stitches in my career. My nose was broken nine times in 16 years. And, uh, it never fazed me, you know?"

He had formerly boxed while a member of the United States Marine Corps, and had worked as a bouncer before turning pro. He was the New Jersey state heavyweight boxing champion, but after losing bouts to George Foreman (by cut eye stoppage in three) and Sonny Liston (by technical knockout in nine) many boxing fans thought that his days as a contender were numbered. After the match with Liston, Wepner needed 72 stitches in his face. After his retirement, Wepner stated that Liston was the hardest puncher he ever fought.

However, after losing to Joe Bugner by a cut eye stoppage in three in England, Wepner won nine of his next eleven bouts, including victories over Charlie Polite and former WBA heavyweight champion Ernie Terrell.

Muhammad Ali fight 
In 1975, it was announced Wepner would challenge Muhammad Ali for the world heavyweight title.

According to the Cleveland Plain Dealer (February 9, 1975, Page 4-C), Carl Lombardo invested $1.3 million to finance the Wepner-Ali heavyweight title bout. According to a Time article, "In Stitches", Ali was guaranteed $1.5 million and Wepner signed for $100,000. This was considerably more than Wepner had ever earned; thus, he "needed no coaxing." Wepner spent eight weeks training in the Catskill Mountains under the guidance of Al Braverman (trainer and noted cutman) and Bill Prezant (manager). Prezant prophesied that the match would be a big surprise. This bout was the first time Wepner had been able to train full-time; since 1970 his typical day had consisted of road work in the morning, followed by his job selling liquor during the day. Then he was able to spend his nights working out and sparring in Bayonne boxing clubs. The match was held on March 24 at the Richfield Coliseum in Richfield, Ohio, south of Cleveland. Before the match, a reporter asked Wepner if he thought he could survive in the ring with the champion, to which Wepner allegedly answered, "I've been a survivor my whole life ... if I survived the Marines, I can survive Ali."

In the ninth round Wepner scored a knockdown, which Ali said occurred because Wepner was stepping on his foot. Published photographs showed Wepner stepping on Ali's foot at the time of the Knockdown. Wepner went to his corner and said to his manager Al Braverman,  "Al, start the car. We're going to the bank. We are millionaires." To this, Wepner's manager replied: "You better turn around. He's getting up and he looks pissed off."

In the remaining rounds, Ali decisively outboxed Wepner and opened up cuts above both of Wepner's eyes and broke his nose. Wepner was far behind on the scorecards when Ali knocked him down with 19 seconds left in the 15th round. The referee counted to seven before calling a technical knockout.

After the Ali-Wepner bout, Sylvester Stallone wrote the script for Rocky, which was released in theatres in 1976. Like Wepner, (Rocky) Balboa lasts 15 rounds, but unlike Wepner, he actually "goes the distance". For years after Rocky was released, Stallone denied that Wepner provided inspiration for the movie, though he eventually admitted that it was so.

Late career 
In 1976, Wepner fought professional wrestler André the Giant and lost by countout after Andre threw him out of the ring.

Wepner's last match was on May 2, 1978, for the New Jersey state heavyweight championship against a new rising prospect, Scott Frank, noted for using a heavy left hook. Wepner lost the match in a 12-round decision, but again proved durable, Ring magazine noted. He announced his retirement afterwards.

Later life 
After his retirement from boxing, Wepner began abusing drugs. In 1979, Sylvester Stallone wanted to cast Wepner as a sparring partner in Rocky II, but he failed the audition due to his drug problems.

In November 1985, Wepner was arrested on drug charges when he was found with four ounces of cocaine in an undercover police investigation. Under a plea-bargain agreement, he was sentenced in 1988 to ten years in prison. He served 17 months in Northern State Prison, Newark, New Jersey, then spent another 20 months in New Jersey's intensive supervision program.

In 2003, Wepner sued Sylvester Stallone, seeking payment for his use as the inspiration for Rocky and the film series. The lawsuit was settled with Stallone in 2006 for an undisclosed amount.

As of 2010, Wepner had been working for 10 years with his third wife Linda in the liquor sales field for Majestic Wines and Spirits in Carlstadt, New Jersey, and was an expert in consumer liquors, wines and spirits.

A film about Wepner's career was released in 2012, and ESPN aired a documentary titled The Real Rocky on October 25, 2011. The ESPN film features a clip of Wepner's ninth round knockdown of Muhammad Ali in their 1975 world heavyweight title bout.

Ring appearances 
Wepner occasionally makes ringside appearances at boxing cards in his home state of New Jersey, signing autographs and posing for photos with boxing fans. On October 12, 2012, Wepner appeared ringside with former World Light Heavyweight champion Mike Rossman in Atlantic City, New Jersey, at a Tropicana Casino & Resort Atlantic City fight card featuring a WBA NABA Lightweight title bout in the main event. Wepner held the WBA NABA heavyweight title during his boxing career.

Portrayals and inspirations 
 Sylvester Stallone's character Rocky Balboa and portions of the Rocky film series were inspired by the life of Chuck Wepner.  For instance, it was speculated that a scene from the 1982 film Rocky III had been influenced by Wepner's fight against Andre the Giant, as the movie features a match versus wrestler Hulk Hogan as "Thunderlips", who throws Rocky out of the ring.
 Liev Schreiber played the role of Wepner in a sports film, Chuck.
 Zach McGowan played the role of Wepner in another sports film, The Brawler.
In 2022 of a statue of Wepner was unveiled in Collins Park in Bayonne. The project had been several years in the works.

Professional boxing record 

|-
| style="text-align:center;" colspan="8"|35 Wins (17 knockouts), 14 Losses, 2 Draws 
|- style="text-align:center; background:#e3e3e3;"
| style="border-style:none none solid solid; "|Result
| style="border-style:none none solid solid; "|Record
| style="border-style:none none solid solid; "|Opponent
| style="border-style:none none solid solid; "|Type
| style="border-style:none none solid solid; "|Round
| style="border-style:none none solid solid; "|Date
| style="border-style:none none solid solid; "|Location
| style="border-style:none none solid solid; "|Notes
|- align=center
|Loss
|35–14–2
|align=left| Scott Frank
|PTS
|12
|
|align=left| 
|align=left|
|- align=center
|Win
|35–13–2
|align=left| Tom Healy
|KO
|5
|
|align=left| 
|align=left|
|- align=center
|Win
|34–13–2
|align=left| Johnny Blaine
|KO
|3
|
|align=left| 
|align=left|
|- align=center
|Loss
|33–13–2
|align=left| Horst Geisler
|TKO
|10
|
|align=left| 
|
|- align=center
|Loss
|33–12–2
|align=left| Mike Schutte
|PTS
|10
|
|align=left| 
|align=left|
|- align=center
|Loss
|33–11–2
|align=left| Duane Bobick
|TKO
|6
|
|align=left| 
|
|- align=center
|Win
|33–10–2
|align=left| Tommy Sheehan
|TKO
|2
|
|align=left| 
|align=left|
|- align=center
|Win
|32–10–2
|align=left| Johnny Dolan
|KO
|3
|
|align=left| 
|align=left|
|- align=center
|Win
|31–10–2
|align=left| Johnny Evans
|TKO
|4
|
|align=left| 
|align=left|
|- align=center
|Loss
|30–10–2
|align=left| Muhammad Ali
|TKO
|15
|
|align=left| 
|align=left|
|- align=center
|Win
|30–9–2
|align=left| Terry Hinke
|TKO
|11
|
|align=left| 
|
|- align=center
|Win
|29–9–2
|align=left| Charley Polite
|KO
|4
|
|align=left| 
|align=left|
|- align=center
|Win
|28–9–2
|align=left| Randy Neumann
|TKO
|6
|
|align=left| 
|align=left|
|- align=center
|Win
|27–9–2
|align=left| Billy Williams
|PTS
|10
|
|align=left| 
|align=left|
|- align=center
|Win
|26–9–2
|align=left| Ernie Terrell
|PTS
|12
|
|align=left| 
|align=left|
|- align=center
|Win
|25–9–2
|align=left| Billy Marquart
|PTS
|12
|
|align=left| 
|align=left|
|- align=center
|Win
|24–9–2
|align=left| John Clohessy
|PTS
|10
|
|align=left| 
|align=left|
|- align=center
|Win
|23–9–2
|align=left| Randy Neumann
|PTS
|12
|
|align=left| 
|align=left|
|- align=center
|Loss
|22–9–2
|align=left| Randy Neumann
|PTS
|12
|
|align=left| 
|align=left|
|- align=center
|Win
|22–8–2
|align=left| Mike Boswell
|TKO
|10
|
|align=left| 
|align=left|
|- align=center
|Win
|21–8–2
|align=left| Jesse Crown
|KO
|4
|
|align=left| 
|align=left|
|- align=center
|Loss
|20–8–2
|align=left| Jerry Judge
|TKO
|5
|
|align=left| 
|align=left|
|- align=center
|Loss
|20–7–2
|align=left| Joe Bugner
|TKO
|3
|
|align=left| 
|
|- align=center
|Loss
|20–6–2
|align=left| Sonny Liston
|
|9
|
|align=left| 
|
|- align=center
|Win
|20–5–2
|align=left| Manuel Ramos
|
|10
|
|align=left| 
|align=left|
|- align=center
|Win
|19–5–2
|align=left| Pedro Agosto
|PTS
|10
|
|align=left| 
|align=left|
|- align=center
|Loss
|18–5–2
|align=left| George Foreman
|TKO
|3
|
|align=left| 
|
|- align=center
|Loss
|18–4–2
|align=left| José Roman
|PTS
|10
|
|align=left| 
|align=left|
|- align=center
|Win
|18–3–2
|align=left| Mike Bruce
|PTS
|8
|
|align=left| 
|align=left|
|- align=center
|Win
|17–3–2
|align=left| Roberto Davila
|
|10
|
|align=left| 
|
|- align=center
|Win
|16–3–2
|align=left| Jerry Tomasetti
|TKO
|1
|
|align=left| 
|align=left|
|- align=center
|Win
|15–3–2
|align=left| Mert Brownfield
|PTS
|10
|
|align=left| 
|align=left|
|- align=center
|Win
|14–3–2
|align=left| Forest Ward
|TKO
|7
|
|align=left| 
|
|- align=center
|Win
|13–3–2
|align=left| Mike Bruce
|PTS
|8
|
|align=left| 
|align=left|
|- align=center
|Win
|12–3–2
|align=left| Eddie Vick
|SD
|10
|
|align=left| 
|align=left|
|- align=center
|Win
|11–3–2
|align=left| Clay Thomas
|TKO
|3
|
|align=left| 
|align=left|
|- align=center
|Win
|10–3–2
|align=left| Charlie Harris
|TKO
|6
|
|align=left| 
|align=left|
|- align=center
|Loss
|9–3–2
|align=left| Jerry Tomasetti
|TKO
|5
|
|align=left| 
|align=left|
|- align=center
|Win
|9–2–2
|align=left| Don McAteer
|TKO
|5
|
|align=left| 
|align=left|
|- align=center
|Win
|8–2–2
|align=left| Dave Centi
|PTS
|6
|
|align=left| 
|align=left|
|- align=center
|Win
|7–2–2
|align=left| Johnny Deutsch
|KO
|6
|
|align=left| 
|align=left|
|- align=center
|Win
|6–2–2
|align=left| Cleo Daniels
|PTS
|6
|
|align=left| 
|align=left|
|- align=center
|Win
|5–2–2
|align=left| Jerry Tomasetti
|PTS
|6
|
|align=left| 
|align=left|
|- align=center
|Loss
|4–2–2
|align=left| Buster Mathis
| 
|3
|
|align=left| 
|
|- align=center
|Loss
|4–1–2
|align=left| Bob Stallings
|PTS
|6
|
|align=left| 
|align=left|
|- align=center
|style="background:#abcdef;"|Draw
|4–0–2
|align=left| Everett Copeland
|PTS
|6
|
|align=left| 
|align=left|
|- align=center
|Win
|4–0–1
|align=left| Raymond Patterson
|
|6
|
|align=left| 
|
|- align=center
|Win
|3–0–1
|align=left| Jerry Tomasetti
|PTS
|4
|
|align=left| 
|align=left|
|- align=center
|style="background:#abcdef;"|Draw
|2–0–1
|align=left| Everett Copeland
|
|6
|
|align=left| 
|align=left|
|- align=center
|Win
|2–0
|align=left| Rudy Pavesi
|
|4
|
|align=left| 
|align=left|
|- align=center
|Win
|1–0
|align=left| George Cooper
|
|3
|
|align=left| 
|align=left|
|- align=center

References

External links 

Chuck Wepner – The Real Rocky, by Peter Hossli, January 1, 2007.

1939 births
Living people
Bayonne High School alumni
Boxers from New Jersey
Sportspeople from Bayonne, New Jersey
Rocky (film series)
United States Marines
American male boxers
American people of German descent
American people of Ukrainian descent
American people of Belarusian descent
Heavyweight boxers
Prisoners and detainees of New Jersey
American people convicted of drug offenses